Ritvik Sahore is an Indian actor who primarily works in Hindi films and web shows. He made his acting debut with Ferrari Ki Sawaari (2012), for which he received Screen Award for Best Child Artist nomination. Sahore is best known for his portrayal of Omkar Singh Phogat in Dangal (2016), Aakash in Laakhon Mein Ek (2017) and Rajat Bakshi in Flames (2018).  

Sahore's other notable work include the film, Gauru: Journey of Courage (2018) and the web series, Indori Ishq (2021), Escaype Live and Ishq Express both (2022).

Early life
Sahore was born on 15 September 2000 in a middle class Hindu family in Mumbai, Maharashtra.

Career
Sahore made his acting debut with Ferrari Ki Sawaari in 2012. He portrayed Sharman Joshi's son in the film. Times of India stated, "Young Ritvik, like a true captain, holds the team together. This little stock of talent is so natural and expressive, he’ll bowl you over." He next portrayed Omkar Singh Phogat, Aparshakti Khurana's younger version in the 2016 film Dangal, which is the highest grossing Indian film.

He did a cameo role of Atul Nadar in the tvThe Good Karma Hospital. The same year, he made his web debut with Laakhon Mein Ek, portraying Akash in the first season of the series. Praising his performance, Mid Day wrote, "Sahore is a treat to watch as he depicts the frustration of a youngster who is a victim of insurmountable expectations."

2018 marked a turning point in Sahore's career. He portrayed the lead in the award-winning film, Gauru: Journey of Courage. He received wide attention with his portrayal of Rajat Bakshi in Flames opposite Tanya Maniktala. The first season released in 2018, season season in 2019. He received praises for his performance. The series renewed for a third season in 2022.

In 2018, he too starred as Ishaan in Awkward Conversations with Parents, opposite Ahsaas Channa. In 2019, he appeared in the short film To Remember Me By. While In 2020, he starred in Awkward Conversations with Girlfriend, a sequel to Awkward Conversations with Parents, opposite Rashmi Agdekar and in the short film, The Twist opposite Gayatri Salkar.

In 2021, Sahore received praises for his portrayal of Kunal Marathe opposite Vedika Bhandari in Indori Ishq. Times of India praised his performance and mentioned, "Sahore's portrayal of a happy-go-lucky man Kunal, is captivating, making the viewers love his character. Kunal’s transformation from a sweet romantic boy to a brooding man, is convincing. The same year, he appeared as Young Matsya in Matsya Kaand. 

Sahore had five releases in 2022. He first appeared in Campus Diaries portraying Abhilash. He next portrayed Sachin in Bro-Founders, a mini-series. Sahore then portrayed Nilesh Sonawane aka Aamcha Spider in Escaype Live. News 18 wrote, "Ritvik Sahore as Aamcha Spider, is effortless."

Sahore next portrayed Aarav Agarwal opposite Gayatri Bhhardwaj in Ishq Express. Times of India noted, "Both Ritvik Sahore and Gayatri Bhardwaj give delightful performances. Ritvik is convincing as a small-town lad who is unsure of what he wants to do with his life." He then portrayed Finolex founder Pralhad P. Chhabria in the award winning short film, Pralhad.

Filmography

Films

Television

Web series

Music videos

Awards and nominations

References

External links 
 

 2000 births
Living people
21st-century Indian actors
Year of birth uncertain
Indian actors